This is a list of companies owned by the central government of Sri Lanka.

Commercial corporations
 Agricultural Insurance Board
 Bank of Ceylon
 Central Bank of Sri Lanka
 Central Engineering Consultancy Bureau
 Ceylon Ceramics Corporation
 Ceylon Electricity Board
 Ceylon Fisheries Corporation
 Ceylon Hotels Corporation
 Ceylon Petroleum Corporation
 Co-operative Wholesale Establishment
 Development Lotteries Board
 Employees Trust Fund Board
 Housing Development Finance Corporation of Sri Lanka
 Janatha Estates Development Board
 Lady Lohore Loan Fund
 Local Loans & Development Fund
 National Film Corporation of Sri Lanka
 National Institute of Business Management
 National Livestock Development Board
 National Lotteries Board
 National Savings Bank
 National Water Supply and Drainage Board
 People's Bank
 Sri Lanka Ayurvedic Drugs Corporation
 Sri Lanka Broadcasting Corporation
 Sri Lanka Bureau of Foreign Employment
 Sri Lanka Cashew Corporation
 Sri Lanka Cement Corporation
 Sri Lanka Export Credit Insurance Corporation
 Sri Lanka Handicrafts Board
 Sri Lanka Land Reclamation & Development Corporation
 Sri Lanka Ports Authority
 Sri Lanka Railway Authority
 Sri Lanka Rubber Manufacturing Export Co. Ltd
 Sri Lanka Rupavahini Corporation
 Sri Lanka State Plantations Corporation
 Sri Lanka Transport Board
 State Development & Construction Corporation
 State Engineering Corporation of Sri Lanka
 State Mortgage & Investment Bank
 State Pharmaceuticals Corporation of Sri Lanka
 State Pharmaceuticals Manufacturing Corporation
 State Printing Corporation 	
 State Timber Corporation
 Urban Development Authority

Government owned companies
 Airport and Aviation Services (Sri Lanka) Limited
 The Associated Newspapers of Ceylon Ltd
 B.C.C. Lanka Ltd
 Building Materials Corporation Ltd
 Ceylon Fertilizer Company Ltd
 Ceylon Shipping Corporation Ltd
 Cey-Nor Foundation Ltd
 Colombo Sack Makers Ltd
 Independent Television Network Ltd
 Kalubovitiyana Tea Factory Ltd
 Lanka Fabrics Ltd
 Lanka Mineral Sands Ltd
 Lanka Phosphate Ltd
 Lanka Salusala Ltd
 Lanka Sathosa Ltd
 Mantai Salt Ltd
 Milk Industries of Lanka (Pvt) Ltd (MILCO)
 National Equipment & Machinery Organization
 National Paper Co. Ltd
 North Sea Ltd
 Paranthan Chemicals Co. Ltd
 Private Sector Infrastructure Development Company
 Skill Development Fund Ltd
 Sri Lanka Rubber Manufacturing Export Co. Ltd
 STC General Trading Company Ltd
 Thamankaduwa Agro Fertilizer Co. Ltd

Other institutions

Plantations
 Agalawatta Plantations Ltd
 Agarapatana Plantations Ltd
 Balangoda Plantations Ltd
 Bogawantalawa Plantations Ltd
 Chilaw Plantations Ltd
 Hapugastenna Plantations Ltd
 Horana Plantations Ltd
 Kahawatte Plantations Ltd
 Kegalle Plantations Ltd
 Kelani Velly Plantations Ltd
 Kotagala Plantations Ltd
 Kurunegala Plantations Ltd
 Maskeliya Plantations Ltd
 Mathurata Plantations Ltd
 Namunukula Plantations Ltd
 Pussallawa Plantations Ltd
 Talawakelle Plantation Ltd
 Uda Pussellawa Plantations Ltd

Other
 Alexandria International (Pvt) Ltd
 Acland Insurance Services Ltd
 Air Ceylon Ltd
 Asbestos Cement Industries Ltd
 Asian Hotels Corporation Ltd
 BOC Management & Support Services (Pvt) Ltd
 BOC Property Development & Management (Pvt) Ltd
 BOC Travels (Pvt) Ltd
 Bogala Graphite Lanka Ltd
 Borwood Ltd
 Building Material Manufacturing Corporation
 Capital Development & Investment Company
 CDIC Fund 2 Ltd
 CEATO
 Ceylease Financial Services Ltd
 Ceylon Agro Industries Ltd
 Ceylon Glass Co. Ltd
 Ceylon Leather Products Ltd
 Ceylon Manufactures& Merchants Ltd
 Ceylon Oxygen Ltd
 Ceylon Port Services Ltd
 Ceylon Shipping Agency (Pvt) Ltd
 Ceylon Shipping Agency (Pvt) (Singapore) Ltd
 Ceylon Shipping Lines Ltd
 Ceylon Silks Ltd
 Ceylon Steel Corporation Ltd
 Colombo Commercial (Teas) Ltd
 Colombo Commercial Fertilizers Ltd
 Colombo Commercial Company (Engineers) Ltd
 Colombo Dockyard Ltd
 Colombo International School
 Colombo Metropolitan Bus Company
 Commercial Bank of Ceylon Ltd
 Consolidated Commercial Agencies
 Consolidated Export & Trading Co. Ltd
 Dairy Development Foundation
 Dankotuwa Porcelain (Pvt) Ltd
 Devco Showa (Pvt) Ltd
 Development Finance Corporation of Ceylon
 Distilleries Company of Sri Lanka Ltd
 Elephant Lite Corporation Ltd
 Elkaduwa Plantations Ltd
 Elpitiya Plantations Ltd
 Fruit Development Board
 Galadari Hotel
 Gampaha Bus Company
 Glaxo Wellcome Ceylon Ltd
 Grain and Pulses Research & Development Authority
 Hingurana Sugar Industries Ltd
 Hotel De Buhari
 Hotel Developers (Lanka) Ltd
 Hotel Services (Ceylon) Ltd
 Hotels Colombo (63) Ltd
 Hunas Falls Hotels Ltd
 International Dairy Products Ltd
 Investment Monitoring Board
 Janatha Fertilizer Co. Ltd
 Kadurata Development Bank
 Kahagolla Engineering Services Co. Ltd (KESCO)
 Kahatagaha Graphite Lanka Ltd
 Kalutara Bus Company
 Kandy Hotels Company (1938) Ltd
 Kantale Sugar Industries Ltd
 Kelani Tyres Ltd
 Land Reclamation & Development Co. Ltd
 Lanhua Fisheries Co. (Pvt) Ltd
 Lanka Archives Management Services (Pvt) Ltd
 Lanka Ashok Leyland
 Lanka Canneries Ltd
 Lanka Cement Co. Ltd
 Lanka Ceramic Ltd
 Lanka Electricity Company (Pvt) Ltd
 Lanka Hydraulic Institute Ltd
 Lanka Industrial Estates Ltd
 Lanka Leyland Ltd
 Lanka Loha Hardware Ltd
 Lanka Lubricants Ltd
 Lanka Machine Leasers Ltd
 Lanka Marine Services (Pvt) Ltd
 Lanka Milk Foods (CWE) Ltd
 Lanka Plywood Products Ltd
 Lanka Products Export Corporation (Pvt) Ltd
 Lanka Puwath Ltd
 Lanka Refractories Ltd
 Lanka Salt Ltd
 Lanka Securities (Pvt) Ltd
 Lanka Synthetic Fibre Co. Ltd
 Lanka Tankers Ltd
 Lanka Textiles & Emporium Ltd
 Lanka Tractors Ltd
 Lanka Transformers Ltd
 Lanka Walltiles (Pvt) Ltd
 Libra Industries Ltd
 Madulsima Plantations Ltd
 Mahanuwara Bus Company
 Mahaveli Venture Capital Co. (Pvt) Ltd
 Mahaweli Merine Cement Company Ltd
 Malwatte Valley Plantations Ltd
 Management Services Rakshana (Pvt) Ltd
 Mattegama Textiles Mills Ltd
 Merchant Bank of Sri Lanka Ltd
 Merchant Credit of Sri Lanka Ltd
 Mercantile Shipping Co. Ltd
 Mushroom Development and Training Center
 National Agricultural Diversification & Settlement Authority
 National Apprenticeship Board
 National Assets Management Ltd
 National Development Bank Ltd
 National Development Bank of Sri Lanka
 National Development Trust Fund
 National Insurance Corporation Ltd
 National Insurance Service
 National Milk Board
 National Packaging Center
 National Packaging Materials Corporation
 National Textiles Corporation
 New Eastern Bus Company
 Noorani Tile Works Ltd
 Northern Transport Company Ltd
 Nuwara Eliya Bus Company
 Ocean View Development (Pvt) Ltd
 Orient Lanka Ltd
 Paddy Marketing Board
 Panadura Tea and Rubber Co. Ltd
 Peliyagoda Ware House Co. Ltd
 Pelwatte Sugar Industries Ltd
 People 's Travels (Pvt) Ltd
 People's Venture Investment Company
 People's Leasing Co. (Pvt) Ltd
 People's Merchant Bank Ltd
 People's Property Development Co. (Pvt) Ltd
 Property Development Limited
 Pugoda Textiles Lanka Ltd
 Puttalam Cement Co. Ltd
 Puttalam Salt Ltd
 Rajarata Bus Company
 Rajarata Development Bank
 Rajarata Food Grain Processing Co. Ltd
 Resettlement and Rehabilitation Authority of North
 Rever Valley's Development Board
 Road Construction & Development Co. (Pvt) Ltd
 Robinson Club Bentota Ltd
 Ruhuna 2001- Venture Capital Co. (Pvt) Ltd
 Ruhunu 2001 Consultancy Services
 Ruhunu 2001 Human Resources Development & Training Co. (Pvt) Ltd
 Ruhunu 2001 Management & Secretarial Services (Pvt) Ltd
 Ruhunu Agro Fertilizer Co. Ltd
 Ruhunu Bus Company
 Ruhunu Cement Company Ltd
 Ruhunu Development Bank
 Sabaragamuwa Bus Company
 Sabaragamuwa Development Bank
 Sathosa Computer Services Ltd
 Sathosa Motors Ltd
 Sathosa Priners Ltd
 Sea Lion Express Ltd
 Self-employment Project
 Sevanagala Sugar Industries Ltd
 Shaw Industries Ltd
 Shell Gas Lanka Ltd (Colombo Gas Company Ltd)
 Small Industries Corporation
 Spices & Allied Products Marketing Board
 Sri Lanka Port Management & Consultancy Services Ltd
 Sri Lanka EDI Network Services (Pvt) Ltd
 Sri Lanka Industrial Development Co. Ltd
 Sri Lanka Institute of Co-operative Management
 Sri Lanka Insurance Corporation Ltd
 Sri Lanka Institute of Development Administration
 Sri Lanka Insurance & Robinson Hotel Company Ltd
 Sri Lanka-Libya Agricultural & Livestock Development Co. Ltd
 Sri Lanka State Trading Corporation
 Sri Lanka Sugar Co. Ltd
 Sri Lanka Telecom Ltd
 Sri Lanka Telecom Services Ltd
 Sri Lanka Tobacco Industries Corporation (Tobacco Industries Ltd)
 SriLankan Airlines
 Statcon Rubber Company Ltd
 State Fertilizer Manufacturing Corporation
 State Flour Milling Corpotion
 State Gem Corporation
 Taj Lanka Hotels Ltd
 Tea Small Holder Factories Ltd
 The Selinsing Co. Ltd
 The Unit Trust Management Co. (Pvt) Ltd
 Thomas De La Rue Lanka (Pvt) Ltd
 Thulhiriya Textiles Mills
 Times of Ceylon
 United Motors Ltd
 University Affiliated College - Buttala
 University Affiliated College - Central
 University Affiliated College - Eastern
 University Affiliated College - North Central
 University Affiliated College - North Western
 University Affiliated College - Sabaragamuwa
 University Affiliated College - Trincomalee
 University Affiliated College - Uva
 University Affiliated College - Western
 Uva Development Bank
 Uva Bus Company
 Vavunia Passenger Transport Services Ltd
 Vegetable Development Board
 Veyangoda Textile Mills Ltd
 Watapota Investments Ltd
 Wattawala Plantations Ltd
 Wayamba Agro Fertilizer Co. Ltd
 Wayamba Bus Company
 Wayamba Development Bank
 Weaving Supplies Corporation
 Wellawatta Spinning & Weaving Mills
 Werahera Engineering Services Co. Ltd (WESCO)
 Wijaya Tiles Ltd
 Youth Services (Dance Group) Ltd
 Youth Services Co. Ltd

See also

 List of companies of Sri Lanka
 List of government-owned companies
 List of statutory boards of Sri Lanka

References
 
 
 

 
Government-owned companies
Sri Lanka